Dietmar Roth (born 16 September 1963 in Karlsruhe, Baden-Württemberg) is a German former professional footballer who played as a defender.

Honours
Eintracht Frankfurt
DFB-Pokal: 1987–88

References

1963 births
Living people
German footballers
Association football defenders
Karlsruher SC players
FC Schalke 04 players
Eintracht Frankfurt players
Kickers Offenbach players
FSV Frankfurt players
Bundesliga players
2. Bundesliga players
Footballers from Karlsruhe